Eutrichodesmus is a genus of millipedes in the family Haplodesmidae, containing at least 32 species in China, Taiwan, and Southeast Asia. One of these species (Eutrichodesmus peculiaris) exhibits sexual dimorphism in segments number: The adult females have 20 segments (including the telson), but the adult males have only 19.

Species
 Eutrichodesmus arcicollaris   Zhang, 1993
 Eutrichodesmus armatocaudatus   Golovatch, Geoffroy, Mauriès & VandenSpiegel, 2009
 Eutrichodesmus aster   Golovatch, Geoffroy, Mauriès & VandenSpiegel, 2009
 Eutrichodesmus asteroides   Golovatch, Geoffroy, Mauriès & VandenSpiegel, 2009
 Eutrichodesmus basalis   Golovatch, Geoffroy, Mauriès & VandenSpiegel, 2009
 Eutrichodesmus cavernicola   Sinclair, 1901
 Eutrichodesmus communicans   Golovatch, Geoffroy, Mauriès & VandenSpiegel, 2009
 Eutrichodesmus curticornis   Golovatch, Geoffroy, Mauriès & VandenSpiegel, 2009
 Eutrichodesmus demangei   Silvestri, 1910
 Eutrichodesmus deporatus  Liu, Golovatch & Wesener, 2017
 Eutrichodesmus distinctus   Golovatch, Geoffroy, Mauriès & VandenSpiegel, 2009
 Eutrichodesmus dorsiangulatus   Zhang, 1993
 Eutrichodesmus filisetiger   Golovatch, Geoffroy, Mauriès & VandenSpiegel, 2009
 Eutrichodesmus gremialis   Hoffman, 1982
 Eutrichodesmus griseus   Golovatch, Geoffroy, Mauriès & VandenSpiegel, 2009
 Eutrichodesmus incisus   Golovatch, Geoffroy, Mauriès & VandenSpiegel, 2009
 Eutrichodesmus latus   Golovatch, Geoffroy, Mauriès & VandenSpiegel, 2009
 Eutrichodesmus macclurei   Hoffman, 1977
 Eutrichodesmus monodentus   Zhang, 1993
 Eutrichodesmus multilobatus   Golovatch, Geoffroy, Mauriès & VandenSpiegel, 2009
 Eutrichodesmus paraster  Liu, Golovatch & Wesener, 2017
 Eutrichodesmus parvus  Liu, Golovatch & Wesener, 2017
 Eutrichodesmus peculiaris   Murakami, 1966
 Eutrichodesmus reclinatus   Hoffman, 1977
 Eutrichodesmus reductus   Golovatch, Geoffroy, Mauriès & VandenSpiegel, 2009
 Eutrichodesmus regularis   Golovatch, Geoffroy, Mauriès & VandenSpiegel, 2009
 Eutrichodesmus similis   Golovatch, Geoffroy, Mauriès & VandenSpiegel, 2009
 Eutrichodesmus steineri  Liu, Golovatch & Wesener, 2017

Gallery

References

Further reading
 Golovatch, S. I.; Geoffroy, J.-J.; Mauriès, J.-P.; VandenSpiegel, D. 2009: Review of the millipede family Haplodesmidae Cook, 1895, with descriptions of some new or poorly-known species (Diplopoda, Polydesmida). In: Golovatch, S. I.; Mesibov, R. (eds.) Advances in the systematics of Diplopoda I. ZooKeys, 7: 1-53. Abstract PDF
 Hoffman, R. L. 1977: The systematic position of the diplopod family Doratodesmidae, and description of a new genus from Malaya (Polydesmida). Pacific insects, 17: 247-255. PDF
 Hoffman, R. L. 1977b: Diplopoda from Malayan caves, collected by M. Pierre Strinati. Revue Suisse de Zoologie, 84(3): 699-719.
 Hoffman, R. L. 1982: A new genus and species of doratodesmid milliped from Thailand. Archives des sciences (Geneva), 35(1): 87-93.
 Murakami, Y. 1966: Postembryonic development of the common Myriapoda in Japan XXI. A new genus of the family Oniscodesmidae and a new species of the genus Arachandrodesmus (Cryptodesmidae). Zoological magazine, 75(2): 30-33.
 Silvestri, F. 1910: Descrizione preliminari di nuovi generi di Diplopodi. Zoologischer Anzeiger, 35: 357-364.

Polydesmida
Millipedes of Asia